Go is a statically typed, compiled high-level programming language designed at Google by Robert Griesemer, Rob Pike, and Ken Thompson. It is syntactically similar to C, but with memory safety, garbage collection, structural typing, and CSP-style concurrency. It is often referred to as Golang because of its former domain name, golang.org, but its proper name is Go.

There are two major implementations:

 Google's self-hosting "gc" compiler toolchain, targeting multiple operating systems and WebAssembly.
 gofrontend, a frontend to other compilers, with the libgo library. With GCC the combination is gccgo; with LLVM the combination is gollvm.

A third-party source-to-source compiler, GopherJS, compiles Go to JavaScript for front-end web development.

History
Go was designed at Google in 2007 to improve programming productivity in an era of multicore, networked machines and large codebases. The designers wanted to address criticism of other languages in use at Google, but keep their useful characteristics:
 Static typing and run-time efficiency (like C)
 Readability and usability (like Python or JavaScript)
 High-performance networking and multiprocessing

Its designers were primarily motivated by their shared dislike of C++.

Go was publicly announced in November 2009, and version 1.0 was released in March 2012. Go is widely used in production at Google and in many other organizations and open-source projects.

Branding and styling

The Gopher mascot was introduced in 2009 for the open source launch of the language.  The design, by Renée_French, borrowed from a c. 2000 WFMU promotion. 

In November 2016, the Go and Go Mono fonts were released by type designers Charles Bigelow and Kris Holmes specifically for use by the Go project. Go is a humanist sans-serif resembling Lucida Grande, and Go Mono is monospaced. Both fonts adhere to the WGL4 character set and were designed to be legible with a large x-height and distinct letterforms. Both Go and Go Mono adhere to the DIN 1450 standard by having a slashed zero, lowercase l with a tail, and an uppercase I with serifs.

In April 2018, the original logo was replaced with a stylized GO slanting right with trailing streamlines. (The Gopher mascot remained the same.)

Generics
The lack of support for generic programming in initial versions of Go drew considerable criticism. The designers expressed an openness to generic programming and noted that built-in functions were in fact type-generic, but are treated as special cases; Pike called this a weakness that might at some point be changed. The Google team built at least one compiler for an experimental Go dialect with generics, but did not release it.

In August 2018, the Go principal contributors published draft designs for generic programming and error handling and asked users to submit feedback. However, the error handling proposal was eventually abandoned.

In June 2020, a new draft design document was published that would add the necessary syntax to Go for declaring generic functions and types. A code translation tool, was provided to allow users to try the new syntax, along with a generics-enabled version of the online Go Playground.

Generics were finally added to Go in version 1.18.

Versioning
Go 1 guarantees compatibility for the language specification and major parts of the standard library. All versions up to the current Go 1.19 release have maintained this promise.

Each major Go release is supported until there are two newer major releases.

Design
Go is influenced by C (especially the Plan 9 dialect), but with an emphasis on greater simplicity and safety. It consists of:
 A syntax and environment adopting patterns more common in dynamic languages:
 Optional concise variable declaration and initialization through type inference (x := 0 instead of int x = 0; or var x = 0;)
 Fast compilation
 Remote package management (go get) and online package documentation
 Distinctive approaches to particular problems:
 Built-in concurrency primitives: light-weight processes (goroutines), channels, and the select statement
 An interface system in place of virtual inheritance, and type embedding instead of non-virtual inheritance
 A toolchain that, by default, produces statically linked native binaries without external Go dependencies
 A desire to keep the language specification simple enough to hold in a programmer's head, in part by omitting features that are common in similar languages.

Syntax
Go's syntax includes changes from C aimed at keeping code concise and readable. A combined declaration/initialization operator was introduced that allows the programmer to write i := 3 or s := "Hello, world!", without specifying the types of variables used. This contrasts with C's int i = 3; and const char *s = "Hello, world!";. Semicolons still terminate statements; but are implicit when the end of a line occurs. Methods may return multiple values, and returning a result, err pair is the conventional way a method indicates an error to its caller in Go. Go adds literal syntaxes for initializing struct parameters by name and for initializing maps and slices. As an alternative to C's three-statement for loop, Go's range expressions allow concise iteration over arrays, slices, strings, maps, and channels.

Types
Go has a number of built-in types, including numeric ones (etc.), booleans, and byte strings. Strings are immutable; built-in operators and keywords (rather than functions) provide concatenation, comparison, and UTF-8 encoding/decoding. Record types can be defined with the  keyword.

For each type  and each non-negative integer constant , there is an array type denoted ; arrays of differing lengths are thus of different types. Dynamic arrays are available as "slices", denoted  for some type . These have a length and a capacity specifying when new memory needs to be allocated to expand the array. Several slices may share their underlying memory.

Pointers are available for all types, and the pointer-to- type is denoted . There is no pointer arithmetic, except via the special  type in the standard library.

Hash tables are built into the language, with special syntax and built-in functions.  is a channel that allows sending values of type T between concurrent Go processes.

Some conversions between types (e.g., between the various integer types) are pre-defined and adding a new type may define additional conversions, but conversions between named types must always be invoked explicitly. For example, the  keyword can be used to define a type for IPv4 addresses, based on 32-bit unsigned integers:

type ipv4addr uint32

With this type definition,  interprets the  value  as an IP address. Simply assigning  to a variable of type  is a type error.

Constant expressions may be either typed or "untyped"; they are given a type when assigned to a typed variable if the value they represent passes a compile-time check.

Function types are indicated by the  keyword; they take zero or more parameters and return zero or more values, all of which are typed.

Any named type has a method set associated with it. The IP address example above can be extended with a method for checking whether its value is a known standard:

// ZeroBroadcast reports whether addr is 255.255.255.255.
func (addr ipv4addr) ZeroBroadcast() bool {
    return addr == 0xFFFFFFFF
}

While methods have special definition and call syntax, there is no distinct method type.

Interface system
Go provides two features that replace class inheritance.

The first is embedding, which can be viewed as an automated form of composition.

The second are its interfaces, which provides runtime polymorphism. Interfaces are a class of types and provide a limited form of structural typing in the otherwise nominal type system of Go. An object which is of an interface type is also of another type, much like C++ objects being simultaneously of a base and derived class. Go interfaces were designed after protocols from the Smalltalk programming language. Multiple sources use the term duck typing when describing Go interfaces. Although the term duck typing is not precisely defined and therefore not wrong, it usually implies that type conformance is not statically checked. Because conformance to a Go interface is checked statically by the Go compiler (except when performing a type assertion), the Go authors prefer the term structural typing.

The definition of an interface type lists required methods by name and type. Any object of type T for which functions exist matching all the required methods of interface type I is an object of type I as well. The definition of type T need not (and cannot) identify type I. For example, if ,   are defined as

import "math"

type Shape interface {
    Area() float64
}

type Square struct { // Note: no "implements" declaration
    side float64
}

func (sq Square) Area() float64 { return sq.side * sq.side }

type Circle struct { // No "implements" declaration here either
    radius float64
}

func (c Circle) Area() float64 { return math.Pi * math.Pow(c.radius, 2) }

In formal language, Go's interface system provides structural rather than nominal typing. Interfaces can embed other interfaces with the effect of creating a combined interface that is satisfied by exactly the types that implement the embedded interface and any methods that the newly defined interface adds.

Besides calling methods via interfaces, Go allows converting interface values to other types with a run-time type check. The language constructs to do so are the type assertion, which checks against a single potential type:var shp Shape = Square{5}
square, ok := shp.(Square) // Asserts Square type on shp, should work
if ok {
	fmt.Printf("%#v\n", square)
} else {
	fmt.Println("Can't print shape as Square")
}and the type switch, which checks against multiple types:func (sq Square) Diagonal() float64 { return sq.side * math.Sqrt2 }
func (c Circle) Diameter() float64 { return 2 * c.radius }

func LongestContainedLine(shp Shape) float64 {
	switch v := shp.(type) {
	case Square:
		return v.Diagonal() // Or, with type assertion, shp.(Square).Diagonal()
	case Circle:
		return v.Diameter() // Or, with type assertion, shp.(Circle).Diameter()
	default:
		return 0 // In practice, this should be handled with errors
	}
}The empty interface interface{} is an important base case because it can refer to an item of any concrete type. It is similar to the  class in Java or C# and is satisfied by any type, including built-in types like . Code using the empty interface cannot simply call methods (or built-in operators) on the referred-to object, but it can store the interface{} value, try to convert it to a more useful type via a type assertion or type switch, or inspect it with Go's reflect package. Because interface{} can refer to any value, it is a limited way to escape the restrictions of static typing, like void* in C but with additional run-time type checks.

The interface{} type can be used to model structured data of any arbitrary schema in Go, such as JSON or YAML data, by representing it as a map[string]interface{} (map of string to empty interface). This recursively describes data in the form of a dictionary with string keys and values of any type.

Interface values are implemented using pointer to data and a second pointer to run-time type information. Like some other types implemented using pointers in Go, interface values are nil if uninitialized.

Generic code using parameterized types

Since version 1.18, Go supports generic code using parameterized types.

Package system
In Go's package system, each package has a path (e.g., "compress/bzip2" or "golang.org/x/net/html") and a name (e.g., bzip2 or html). References to other packages' definitions must always be prefixed with the other package's name, and only the capitalized names from other packages are accessible: io.Reader is public but bzip2.reader is not. The go get command can retrieve packages stored in a remote repository and developers are encouraged to develop packages inside a base path corresponding to a source repository (such as example.com/user_name/package_name) to reduce the likelihood of name collision with future additions to the standard library or other external libraries.

Concurrency: goroutines and channels
The Go language has built-in facilities, as well as library support, for writing concurrent programs. Concurrency refers not only to CPU parallelism, but also to asynchrony: letting slow operations like a database or network read run while the program does other work, as is common in event-based servers.

The primary concurrency construct is the goroutine, a type of light-weight process. A function call prefixed with the go keyword starts a function in a new goroutine. The language specification does not specify how goroutines should be implemented, but current implementations multiplex a Go process's goroutines onto a smaller set of operating-system threads, similar to the scheduling performed in Erlang.

While a standard library package featuring most of the classical concurrency control structures (mutex locks, etc.) is available, idiomatic concurrent programs instead prefer channels, which send messages between goroutines. Optional buffers store messages in FIFO order and allow sending goroutines to proceed before their messages are received.

Channels are typed, so that a channel of type  can only be used to transfer messages of type . Special syntax is used to operate on them;  is an expression that causes the executing goroutine to block until a value comes in over the channel , while  sends the value  (possibly blocking until another goroutine receives the value). The built-in -like  statement can be used to implement non-blocking communication on multiple channels; see below for an example. Go has a memory model describing how goroutines must use channels or other operations to safely share data.

The existence of channels sets Go apart from actor model-style concurrent languages like Erlang, where messages are addressed directly to actors (corresponding to goroutines). The actor style can be simulated in Go by maintaining a one-to-one correspondence between goroutines and channels, but the language allows multiple goroutines to share a channel or a single goroutine to send and receive on multiple channels.

From these tools one can build concurrent constructs like worker pools, pipelines (in which, say, a file is decompressed and parsed as it downloads), background calls with timeout, "fan-out" parallel calls to a set of services, and others. Channels have also found uses further from the usual notion of interprocess communication, like serving as a concurrency-safe list of recycled buffers, implementing coroutines (which helped inspire the name goroutine), and implementing iterators.

Concurrency-related structural conventions of Go (channels and alternative channel inputs) are derived from Tony Hoare's communicating sequential processes model. Unlike previous concurrent programming languages such as Occam or Limbo (a language on which Go co-designer Rob Pike worked), Go does not provide any built-in notion of safe or verifiable concurrency. While the communicating-processes model is favored in Go, it is not the only one: all goroutines in a program share a single address space. This means that mutable objects and pointers can be shared between goroutines; see , below.

Suitability for parallel programming
Although Go's concurrency features are not aimed primarily at parallel processing, they can be used to program shared-memory multi-processor machines. Various studies have been done into the effectiveness of this approach. One of these studies compared the size (in lines of code) and speed of programs written by a seasoned programmer not familiar with the language and corrections to these programs by a Go expert (from Google's development team), doing the same for Chapel, Cilk and Intel TBB. The study found that the non-expert tended to write divide-and-conquer algorithms with one  statement per recursion, while the expert wrote distribute-work-synchronize programs using one goroutine per processor. The expert's programs were usually faster, but also longer.

Lack of race condition for safety
Go's approach to concurrency can be summarized as "don't communicate by sharing memory; share memory by communicating". There are no restrictions on how go-routines access shared data, making race conditions possible. Specifically, unless a program explicitly synchronizes via channels or other means, writes from one go-routine might be partly, entirely, or not at all visible to another, often with no guarantees about ordering of writes. Furthermore, Go's internal data structures like interface values, slice headers, hash tables, and string headers are not immune to race conditions, so type and memory safety can be violated in multithreaded programs that modify shared instances of those types without synchronization. Instead of language support, safe concurrent programming thus relies on conventions; for example, Chisnall recommends an idiom called "aliases xor mutable", meaning that passing a mutable value (or pointer) over a channel signals a transfer of ownership over the value to its receiver.. For this reason, the go compiler has had a race condition detector since go 1.1

Binaries
The linker in the gc toolchain creates statically linked binaries by default; therefore all Go binaries include the Go runtime.

Omissions
Go deliberately omits certain features common in other languages, including (implementation) inheritance, assertions, pointer arithmetic, implicit type conversions, untagged unions, and tagged unions. The designers added only those facilities that all three agreed on.

Of the omitted language features, the designers explicitly argue against assertions and pointer arithmetic, while defending the choice to omit type inheritance as giving a more useful language, encouraging instead the use of interfaces to achieve dynamic dispatch and composition to reuse code. Composition and delegation are in fact largely automated by  embedding; according to researchers Schmager et al., this feature "has many of the drawbacks of inheritance: it affects the public interface of objects, it is not fine-grained (i.e, no method-level control over embedding), methods of embedded objects cannot be hidden, and it is static", making it "not obvious" whether programmers will overuse it to the extent that programmers in other languages are reputed to overuse inheritance.

Exception handling was initially omitted in Go due to lack of a "design that gives value proportionate to the complexity". An exception-like / mechanism that avoids the usual try-catch control structure was proposed and released in the March 30, 2010 snapshot. The Go authors advise using it for unrecoverable errors such as those that should halt an entire program or server request, or as a shortcut to propagate errors up the stack within a package. Across package boundaries, Go includes a canonical error type, and multi-value returns using this type are the standard idiom.

Style
The Go authors put substantial effort into influencing the style of Go programs:

 Indentation, spacing, and other surface-level details of code are automatically standardized by the gofmt tool. It uses tabs for indentation and blanks for alignment. Alignment assumes that an editor is using a fixed-width font. golint does additional style checks automatically, but has been deprecated and archived by the Go maintainers.
 Tools and libraries distributed with Go suggest standard approaches to things like API documentation (godoc), testing (go test), building (go build), package management (go get), and so on.
 Go enforces rules that are recommendations in other languages, for example banning cyclic dependencies, unused variables or imports, and implicit type conversions.
 The omission of certain features (for example, functional-programming shortcuts like map and Java-style try/finally blocks) tends to encourage a particular explicit, concrete, and imperative programming style.
 On day one the Go team published a collection of Go idioms, and later also collected code review comments, talks, and official blog posts to teach Go style and coding philosophy.

Tools
The main Go distribution includes tools for building, testing, and analyzing code:

 go build, which builds Go binaries using only information in the source files themselves, no separate makefiles
 go test, for unit testing and microbenchmarks
 go fmt, for formatting code
 go install, for retrieving and installing remote packages
 go vet, a static analyzer looking for potential errors in code
 go run, a shortcut for building and executing code
 godoc, for displaying documentation or serving it via HTTP
 gorename, for renaming variables, functions, and so on in a type-safe way
 go generate, a standard way to invoke code generators
 go mod, for creating a new module, adding dependencies, upgrading dependencies, etc.

It also includes profiling and debugging support, runtime instrumentation (for example, to track garbage collection pauses), and a race condition tester.

An ecosystem of third-party tools adds to the standard distribution, such as gocode, which enables code autocompletion in many text editors, goimports, which automatically adds/removes package imports as needed, and errcheck, which detects code that might unintentionally ignore errors.

Examples

Hello world
package main

import "fmt"

func main() {
    fmt.Println("hello world")
}

where "fmt" is the package for formatted I/O, similar to C's C file input/output.

Concurrency
The following simple program demonstrates Go's concurrency features to implement an asynchronous program. It launches two lightweight threads ("goroutines"): one waits for the user to type some text, while the other implements a timeout. The  statement waits for either of these goroutines to send a message to the main routine, and acts on the first message to arrive (example adapted from David Chisnall's book).

package main

import (
    "fmt"
    "time"
)

func readword(ch chan string) {
    fmt.Println("Type a word, then hit Enter.")
    var word string
    fmt.Scanf("%s", &word)
    ch <- word
}

func timeout(t chan bool) {
    time.Sleep(5 * time.Second)
    t <- false
}

func main() {
    t := make(chan bool)
    go timeout(t)

    ch := make(chan string)
    go readword(ch)

    select {
    case word := <-ch:
        fmt.Println("Received", word)
    case <-t:
        fmt.Println("Timeout.")
    }
}

Testing
The testing package provides support for automated testing of go packages. Target function example:

func ExtractUsername(email string) string {
	at := strings.Index(email, "@")
	return email[:at]
}

Test code (note that assert keyword is missing in Go; tests live in <filename>_test.go at the same package):

import (
    "testing"
)

func TestExtractUsername(t *testing.T) {
	t.Run("withoutDot", func(t *testing.T) {
		username := ExtractUsername("r@google.com")
		if username != "r" {
			t.Fatalf("Got: %v\n", username)
		}
	})

	t.Run("withDot", func(t *testing.T) {
		username := ExtractUsername("jonh.smith@example.com")
		if username != "jonh.smith" {
			t.Fatalf("Got: %v\n", username)
		}
	})
}

It is possible to run tests in parallel.

Web App
The net/http package provides support for creating web applications.

This example would show "Hello world!" when localhost:8080 is visited.
package main

import (
    "fmt"
    "log"
    "net/http"
)

func helloFunc(w http.ResponseWriter, r *http.Request) {
    fmt.Fprintf(w, "Hello world!")
}

func main() {
    http.HandleFunc("/", helloFunc)
    log.Fatal(http.ListenAndServe(":8080", nil))
}

Applications
Some notable open-source applications written in Go include:

 Caddy, an open source HTTP/2 web server with automatic HTTPS capability
 CockroachDB, an open source, survivable, strongly consistent, scale-out SQL database
 Consul, a software for DNS-based service discovery and providing distributed Key-value storage, segmentation and configuration.
 Docker, a set of tools for deploying Linux containers
 EdgeX, a vendor-neutral open-source platform hosted by the Linux Foundation, providing a common framework for industrial IoT edge computing
 Grafana, a multi-platform open source analytics and interactive visualization web application, whose back end is written in Go. 
 Hugo, a static site generator
 InfluxDB, an open source database specifically to handle time series data with high availability and high performance requirements
 InterPlanetary File System, a content-addressable, peer-to-peer hypermedia protocol
 Juju, a service orchestration tool by Canonical, packagers of Ubuntu Linux
 Kubernetes container management system
 lnd, an implementation of the Bitcoin Lightning Network
 Mattermost, a teamchat system
 NATS Messaging, an open-source messaging system featuring the core design principles of performance, scalability, and ease of use
 OpenShift, a cloud computing platform as a service by Red Hat
 Prometheus, an open-source monitoring and alerting tool.
 Rclone, a command line program to manage files on cloud storage and other high latency services
 Snappy, a package manager for Ubuntu Touch developed by Canonical
 Syncthing, an open-source file synchronization client/server application
 Terraform, an open-source, multiple cloud infrastructure provisioning tool from HashiCorp
 TiDB, an open-source, distributed HTAP database compatible with the MySQL protocol from PingCAP
 Vitess, an open-source, distributed MySQL compatible database out of YouTube that is now hosted by the Cloud Native Computing Foundation
 arctil, Web security assessment tool

Other notable companies and sites using Go (generally together with other languages, not exclusively) include:

 Cacoo, for their rendering of the user dashboard page and microservice using Go and gRPC
 Chango, a programmatic advertising company uses Go in its real-time bidding systems
 Cloud Foundry, a platform as a service
 Cloudflare, for their delta-coding proxy Railgun, their distributed DNS service, as well as tools for cryptography, logging, stream processing, and accessing SPDY sites
 Container Linux (formerly CoreOS), a Linux-based operating system that uses Docker containers and rkt containers
 Couchbase, Query and Indexing services within the Couchbase Server
 Dropbox, who migrated some of their critical components from Python to Go
 Ethereum, The go-ethereum implementation of the Ethereum Virtual Machine blockchain for the Ether cryptocurrency
 GitLab, a web-based DevOps lifecycle tool that provides a Git-repository, wiki, issue-tracking, continuous integration, deployment pipeline features
 Google, for many projects, notably including download server dl.google.com
 Heroku, for Doozer, a lock service
 Hyperledger Fabric, an open source, enterprise-focused distributed ledger project
 MongoDB, tools for administering MongoDB instances
 Netflix, for two portions of their server architecture
 Nutanix, for a variety of micro-services in its Enterprise Cloud OS
 Plug.dj, an interactive online social music streaming website
 SendGrid, a Boulder, Colorado-based transactional email delivery and management service.
 SoundCloud, for "dozens of systems"
 Splice, for the entire backend (API and parsers) of their online music collaboration platform
 Tendermint, The official GO implementation of the tendermint Proof of Stake protocol
 ThoughtWorks, some tools and applications for continuous delivery and instant messages (CoyIM)
 Twitch, for their IRC-based chat system (migrated from Python)
 Uber, for handling high volumes of geofence-based queries

See also related query to Wikidata.

Reception
The interface system, and the deliberate omission of inheritance, were praised by Michele Simionato, who likened these characteristics to those of Standard ML, calling it "a shame that no popular language has followed [this] particular route".

Dave Astels at Engine Yard wrote in 2009:

Go was named Programming Language of the Year by the TIOBE Programming Community Index in its first year, 2009, for having a larger 12-month increase in popularity (in only 2 months, after its introduction in November) than any other language that year, and reached 13th place by January 2010, surpassing established languages like Pascal. By June 2015, its ranking had dropped to below 50th in the index, placing it lower than COBOL and Fortran. But as of January 2017, its ranking had surged to 13th, indicating significant growth in popularity and adoption. Go was awarded TIOBE programming language of the year 2016.

Bruce Eckel has stated:

A 2011 evaluation of the language and its  implementation in comparison to C++ (GCC), Java and Scala by a Google engineer found:

The evaluation got a rebuttal from the Go development team. Ian Lance Taylor, who had improved the Go code for Hundt's paper, had not been aware of the intention to publish his code, and says that his version was "never intended to be an example of idiomatic or efficient Go"; Russ Cox then optimized the Go code, as well as the C++ code, and got the Go code to run slightly faster than C++ and more than an order of magnitude faster than the code in the paper.

Naming dispute
On November 10, 2009, the day of the general release of the language, Francis McCabe, developer of the Go! programming language (note the exclamation point), requested a name change of Google's language to prevent confusion with his language, which he had spent 10 years developing. McCabe raised concerns that "the 'big guy' will end up steam-rollering over" him, and this concern resonated with the more than 120 developers who commented on Google's official issues thread saying they should change the name, with some even saying the issue contradicts Google's motto of: Don't be evil.

On October 12, 2010, the issue was closed by Google developer Russ Cox (@rsc) with the custom status "Unfortunate" accompanied by the following comment: "There are many computing products and services named Go. In the 11 months since our release, there has been minimal confusion of the two languages."

Criticism

 Go's nil combined with the lack of algebraic types leads to difficulty handling failures and base cases.
 Go does not allow an opening brace to appear on its own line, which forces all Go programmers to use the same brace style.
 File semantics in Go standard library are heavily based on POSIX semantics, and they do not map well to the Windows platform. Note that this problem is not particular to Go, but other programming languages have solved it through well defined standard libraries.
 A study showed that it is as easy to make concurrency bugs with message passing as with shared memory, sometimes even more.

See also

 Fat pointer
 Comparison of programming languages
 Robert Griesemer
 Rob Pike
 Ken Thompson

Notes

References

Further reading

External links

 

 
2009 software
American inventions
C programming language family
Concurrent programming languages
Cross-platform free software
Cross-platform software
Free compilers and interpreters
Google software
High-level programming languages
Procedural programming languages
Programming languages
Programming languages created in 2009
Software using the BSD license
Statically typed programming languages
Systems programming languages